The women's 800 metres at the 2002 European Athletics Championships were held at the Olympic Stadium on August 6–8.

Medalists

Results

Heats
Qualification: First 3 of each heat (Q) and the next 4 fastest (q) qualified for the semifinals.

Semifinals
Qualification: First 3 of each semifinal (Q) and the next 2 fastest (q) qualified for the final.

Final

External links

800
800 metres at the European Athletics Championships
2002 in women's athletics